Jos to the World is the third studio album by Ice Prince. It was the first album released independently under his record label Super Cool Cats after he parted ways with the Chocolate City record label.

Track listing

References

2016 albums
Ice Prince albums
Albums produced by Tekno